Jonathan T. M. Reckford is an American businessman and chief executive officer of Habitat for Humanity International. In 2017, The NonProfit Times named him the most influential nonprofit leader in America.

Early life 
Reckford grew up in Chapel Hill, North Carolina. He is the grandson of former New Jersey congresswoman Millicent Fenwick.

He attended the St. Paul's School in New Hampshire. He was awarded a Morehead Scholarship to attend the University of North Carolina at Chapel Hill, where he graduated with a degree in political science in 1984.

In 1984, he joined Goldman Sachs, then was awarded the Henry Luce Foundation Scholarship for Young American Leaders. With that, he traveled to South Korea to work with the Seoul Olympic Organizing Committee on marketing sponsorships. He also coached the Korean national rowing team.

He graduated in 1989 from the Stanford Graduate School of Business with a master's degree in business administration. At Stanford he was struck by a professor's admonition that the same skills that will make you a success in the for-profit world also are desperately needed in the not-for-profit world.

Career
Reckford started his career in finance, working for Goldman Sachs. He also was an executive with Marriott, president of stores for the Musicland division of Best Buy, senior vice president of corporate planning and communications for Circuit City, and director of strategic planning at the Walt Disney Company.

Reckford then became executive pastor of Christ Presbyterian Church in Edina, Minnesota.      

He became CEO of Habitat for Humanity International in 2005. He is the author of Creating a Habitat for Humanity: No Hands But Yours (2007) and Our Better Angels: Seven Simple Virtues That Will Change Your Life and the World (2019).

Professional affiliations
Reckford serves on the board of InterAction, the Stanford Graduate School of Business, the Federal Reserve Bank of Atlanta, and the Duke Fuqua School Center for the Advancement of Social Entrepreneurship (CASE). He is also a member of the Council on Foreign Relations and the Urban Steering Committee for the World Economic Forum.

Personal life 
Reckford and his wife, Ashley, have three children and live in Atlanta.

References

External links
Chief Executive Officer profile at Habitat for Humanity

Living people
Year of birth missing (living people)
Stanford Graduate School of Business alumni
University of North Carolina at Chapel Hill alumni
American nonprofit chief executives
Habitat for Humanity people